David Wilkins (born 30 April 1950 in Malahide, County Dublin) is an Irish sailor who competed at five Olympics between 1972 and 1992, winning silver in 1980.

He won a silver medal in sailing for Ireland with partner James Wilkinson at the 1980 Moscow Olympics in the Flying Dutchman class. The sailing events took place at Pirita Yachting Club in Tallinn, Estonia.

He is the first Irish sportsperson to compete at five Olympics.

See also
Ireland at the 1980 Summer Olympics
Sailing at the 1980 Summer Olympics
List of athletes with the most appearances at Olympic Games

References

1950 births
Living people
Olympic sailors of Ireland
Irish male sailors (sport)
Olympic silver medalists for Ireland
Sailors at the 1972 Summer Olympics – Tempest
Sailors at the 1976 Summer Olympics – Tempest
Sailors at the 1980 Summer Olympics – Flying Dutchman
Sailors at the 1988 Summer Olympics – Flying Dutchman
Sailors at the 1992 Summer Olympics – Flying Dutchman
Olympic medalists in sailing
Medalists at the 1980 Summer Olympics
People educated at Wesley College, Dublin
People from Malahide
Sportspeople from Fingal